Chintapalle was a constituency of the Andhra Pradesh Legislative Assembly, India reserved for Scheduled Tribes. It was one of 15 constituencies in the Visakhapatnam district.

Overview
It was part of the Araku Lok Sabha constituency along with another six Vidhan Sabha segments, namely, Kurupam, Parvathipuram, Salur, Araku Valley, Palakonda and Rampachodavaram.

Members of Legislative Assembly
 1978: Depuru Kondala Rao,  Janata Party
 1983: Korabu VenkataRatnam, Telugu Desam Party
 1985: MVV Satyanarayana, Telugu Desam Party
 1989: Balaraju Pasupuleti, Indian National Congress
 1994: Goddeti Demudu, Communist Party of India
 1999: MVV Satyanarayana, Telugu Desam Party
 2004: Goddeti Demudu, Indian National Congress

See also
 List of constituencies of Andhra Pradesh Legislative Assembly

References

Former assembly constituencies of Andhra Pradesh